List of best-selling singles of the 2000s in the United Kingdom may refer to:

 List of best-selling singles of the 2000s (century) in the United Kingdom
 List of best-selling singles of the 2000s (decade) in the United Kingdom